Chwałów may refer to the following places in Poland:
Chwałów, Lower Silesian Voivodeship (south-west Poland)
Chwałów, Greater Poland Voivodeship (west-central Poland)